Sangeet (Music) is a 1992 Hindi film directed by K. Vishwanath starring Jackie Shroff and Madhuri Dixit in lead roles. Madhuri Dixit had a double role as mother and daughter; she later played similar dual mother and daughter role in Aasoo Bane Angarey, released a year later. Dixit's sensitive portrayal in Sangeet was appreciated; despite the film underperforming at the box office and is considered to be one of her best but underrated performances.

Plot 
A blind, orphan girl aspires to be a successful singer. With the help of another street performer, she sets out to make a mark and in the process discovers her real parents.

Cast
 Madhuri Dixit as  Nirmala / Sangeetha  Mother / Daughter Double role
 Jackie Shroff as Sethuram 
 Nitish Bharadwaj as Upendra
 Parikshat Sahni as Doctor
 Shafi Inamdar as Yash
 Aruna Irani as Shanta
 Satish Shah as Dhrupad Prasad
 Asha Sharma as Upendra's mother

Music
The music for the film is composed by the duo Anand Milind with lyrics by Santosh Anand

References

External links 
 

1992 films
1990s Hindi-language films
Films directed by K. Viswanath
Films scored by Anand–Milind
T-Series (company) films